Peterskirchen is a municipality in the district of Ried im Innkreis in the Austrian state of Upper Austria.

Geography
Peterskirchen lies in the Innviertel. About 11 percent of the municipality is forest, and 80 percent is farmland.

References

Cities and towns in Ried im Innkreis District